Androdioecy is a reproductive system characterized by the coexistence of males and hermaphrodites. Androdioecy is rare in comparison with the other major reproductive systems: dioecy, gynodioecy and  hermaphroditism. In animals, androdioecy has been considered a stepping stone in the transition from dioecy to hermaphroditism, and vice versa. 

Androdioecy is sometimes referred to as a mixed breeding system with trioecy and gynodioecy. It is a dimorphic sexual system in plants alongside gynodioecy and dioecy.

Evolution of androdioecy
The fitness requirements for androdioecy to arise and sustain itself are theoretically so improbable that it was long considered that such systems do not exist. Particularly, males and hermaphrodites have to have the same fitness, in other words the same number of offspring, in order to be maintained. However, males only have offspring by fertilizing eggs or ovules of hermaphrodites, while hermaphrodites have offspring both through fertilizing eggs or ovules of other hermaphrodites and their own ovules. This means that all else being equal, males have to fertilize twice as many eggs or ovules as hermaphrodites to make up for the lack of female reproduction.

Androdioecy can evolve either from hermaphroditic ancestors through the invasion of males or from dioecious ancestors through the invasion of hermaphrodites. The ancestral state is important because conditions under which androdioecy can evolve differ significantly.

Androdioecy with dioecious ancestry
In roundworms, clam shrimp, tadpole shrimp and cancrid shrimps, androdioecy has evolved from dioecy. In these systems, hermaphrodites can only fertilize their own eggs (self-fertilize) and do not mate with other hermaphrodites. Males are the only means of outcrossing. Hermaphrodites may be beneficial in colonizing new habitats, because a single hermaphrodite can generate many other individuals. 

In the well-studied roundworm Caenorhabditis elegans, males are very rare and only occur in populations that are in bad condition or stressed. In Caenorhabditis elegans androdioecy is thought to have evolved from dioecy, through a trioecous intermediate.

Androdioecy with hermaphroditic ancestry

In barnacles androdioecy evolved from hermaphroditism. Many plants self-fertilize, and males may be sustained in a population when inbreeding depression is severe because males guarantee outcrossing.

Types of Androdioecy 
The most common form of androdioecy in animals involves hermaphrodites that can reproduce by autogamy or allogamy through ovum with males. However, this type doesn’t involve outcrossing with sperm. This type of androdioecy generally occurs in predominantly gonochoric taxonomy groups.

One type of androdioecy contains outcrossing hermaphrodites which is present in some angiosperms.

Another type of androdioecy has males and simultaneous hermaphrodites in a population due to developmental or conditional sex allocation. Like in some fish species small individuals are hermaphrodites and under circumstances of high density, large individuals become male.

Androdioecious species
Despite their unlikely evolution, 115 androdioecious animal and about 50 androdioecious plant species are known. These species include

Anthozoa (Corals)
Goniastra australensis
Stylophora pistillata

Nematoda (Roundworms)
Rhabditidae (Order Rhabditida)
Caenorhabditis briggsae
Caenorhabditis elegans
Caenorhabditis sp. 11
Oscheius myriophila
Oscheius dolchura
Oscheius tipulae
Oscheius guentheri
Rhabditis rainai
Rhabditis sp. (AF5)
Rhabdias nigrovenosum
Rhabdias rubrovenosa
Rhabdias ranae
Entomelas entomelas

Diplogastridae (Order Rhabditida)
Allodiplogaster sudhausi
Diplogasteroides magnus
Levipalatum texanum
Pristionchus boliviae
Pristionchus fissidentatus
Pristionchus maupasi
Pristionchus mayeri
Pristionchus pacificus
Pristionchus triformis
Sudhausia aristotokia
Sudhausia crassa
Steinernematidae (Order Rhabditida)

Steinernema hermaphroditum

Allanotnematidae (Order Rhabditida)
Allantonema mirabile
Bradynema rigidum

Dorylaimida
Dorylaimus liratus

Nemertea (Ribbon worms)
Prostoma eilhardi

Arthropoda
Clam shrimp
Eulimnadia texana
Eulimnadia africana
Eulimnadia agassizii
Eulimnadia antlei
Eulimnadia braueriana
Eulimnadia brasiliensis
Eulimnadia colombiensis
Eulimnadia cylondrova
Eulimnadia dahli
Eulimnadia diversa
Eulimnadia feriensis
Eulimnadia follisimilis
Eulimnadia thompsoni
Eulimnadia sp. A
Eulimnadia sp. B
Eulimnadia sp. C

Tadpole shrimp
Triops cancriformis
Triops newberryi
Triops longicaudatus

Barnacles
Paralepas klepalae
Paralepas xenophorae
Koleolepas avis
Koleolepas tinkeri
Ibla quadrivalvis
Ibla cumingii
Ibla idiotica
Ibla segmentata
Calantica studeri
Calantica siemensi
Calantica spinosa
Calantica villosa
Arcoscalpellum sp.
Euscalpellum squamuliferum
Scalpellum peronii
Scalpellum scalpellum
Scalpellum vulgare
Scillaelepas arnaudi
Scillaelepas bocquetae
Scillaelepas calyculacilla
Scillaelepas falcate
Scillaelepas fosteri
Smilium hastatum
Smilium peronii
Chelonibia patula
Chelonibia testudinaria
Bathylasma alearum
Bathylasma corolliforme
Conopea galeata
Conopea calceola
Conopea merrilli
Solidobalanus masignotus
Tetrapachylasma trigonum
Megalasma striatum
Octolasmis warwickii

Lysmata
Lysmata wurdemanni
Lysmata amboinensis
Lysmata californica
Lysmata bahia
Lysmata intermedia
Lysmata grabhami
Lysmata seticaudata
Lysmata nilita
Lysmata hochi
Lysmata nayaritensis
Lysmata rafa
Lysmata boggessi
Lysmata ankeri
Lysmata pederseni
Lysmata debelius
Lysmata galapaguensis
Lysmata cf. trisetacea

Insects
Icerya bimaculata
Icerya purchasi
Crypticerya zeteki

Annelida (Ringed worms)
Salvatoria clavata
Ophryotrocha gracilis
Ophryotrocha hartmanni
Ophryotrocha diadema
Ophryotrocha bacci
Ophryotrocha maculata
Ophryotrocha socialis

Chordata
Kryptolebias marmoratus
Serranus fasciatus
Serranus baldwini

Angiosperms (Flowering plants)
Some Acer (maple) species
Castilla elastica
Culcita macrocarpa
Datisca cannabina (false hemp)
Datisca glomerata (Durango root)
Fraxinus lanuginosa (Japanese ash)
Fraxinus ornus
Fuchsia microphylla
Gagea serotina
Mercurialis annua (Annual mercury)
Neobuxbaumia mezcalaensis
Nephelium lappaceum (Rambutan)
Panax trifolius (Ginseng)
Oxalis suksdorfii
Phillyrea angustifolia
Phillyrea latifolia
Ricinocarpus pinifolius
Sagittaria lancifolia (sub-androdioecy)
Saxifraga cernua
Schizopepon bryoniaefolius
Spinifex littoreus
Ulmus minor

See also

Gynodioecy
Plant sexuality

 Dioecy
 Trioecy
 Hermaphrodite
 Monoicy

References

External links

Diana Wolf. 'Breeding systems: Evolution of androdioecy'

Sex
Mating systems
Sexual system